Antonio Toledo Corro (1 April 1919 – 6 July 2018) was a Mexican politician and a member of the Institutional Revolutionary Party (PRI). Born in Escuinapa de Hidalgo, he served as municipal president of Mazatlán from 1959 to 1962. Toledo ran a tractor business and was the director of a newspaper. He was Secretary of the Agrarian Reform of Mexico during the term of President José López Portillo, a personal friend, from 1978 to 1980. Toledo was Governor of Sinaloa from 1981 to 1986. During his tenure a highway connecting Culiacán with Guasave was built, and the Universidad de Occidente and the Colegio de Bachilleres de Sinaloa were founded. However, drug violence also increased substantially, with 6,500 homicides reported. Toledo was a corrupt official whose partnership with the Guadalajara cartel allowed drug trafficking and homicides to leave much of Mexico in shambles. Toledo was married to Estela Ortiz and had three sons. He died on July 6, 2018, at the age of 99. He had been hospitalized in a Mazatlan hospital since June 29, and had been suffering from several different ailments, including pneumonia.

References

1919 births
2018 deaths
Institutional Revolutionary Party politicians
Governors of Sinaloa
Mexican Secretaries of the Agrarian Reform
20th-century Mexican politicians
Municipal presidents in Sinaloa
People from Escuinapa de Hidalgo